Sabine Hinkelmann (born 19 June 1960) is a German rower. She competed in two events at the 1984 Summer Olympics.

References

1960 births
Living people
German female rowers
Olympic rowers of West Germany
Rowers at the 1984 Summer Olympics
Rowers from Berlin